is a Japanese voice actress, singer and radio personality from Saitama Prefecture, Japan. She is currently affiliated with Stay Luck.  She is known for her roles as Hotaru Ichijō in Non Non Biyori, Escha Malier in Atelier Escha & Logy: Alchemists of the Dusk Sky, Ram in Re:Zero − Starting Life in Another World and Anzu in Hinamatsuri.

Murakawa made her solo debut as singer on June 1, 2016 with the double A-side single "Sweet Sensation/Baby, My First Kiss", released under the Nippon Columbia record label. Her stints hosting the radio programs  Etotama Radio ~ Soruraru Kure Nya! ~ and Non Non Biyori Web Radio Non Non Dayori Repeat! Nanon led her to winning the Best Funny Radio (Rookie) and Best Comfort Radio (General) awards at the 2nd Aniraji Awards in 2016. She released her first solo album in January 2017, and she released her second solo album in February 2018.

Biography

Early life
Murakawa was born in Saitama Prefecture on June 1, 1990. From an early age, she had an interest in playing games as well as magical girl anime such as Sailor Moon and Magic Knight Rayearth. During her fifth grade of elementary school, she transferred to another school, an event that years later she would later cite as a common point with her character Hotaru Ichijō in the anime series Non Non Biyori.

During her fifth grade of elementary school, Murakawa started becoming interested in voice acting after watching the anime series Hunter × Hunter, which had been recommended to her by an older cousin. She was inspired by the voice acting performance of Yuki Kaida as the character Kurapika, and she also became interested in the voice of the series' main character, Gon Freecss. After this, she attempted to find ways to audition for voice acting roles, but was stopped. However, her parents promised her that they would let her become a voice actress in the future.

During her junior high school years, Murakawa attempted to join her school's theater club as a first step towards pursuing a voice acting career, but eventually abandoned this and instead joined the school's basketball club, which she would remain part of for three years. She then decided to enroll in a high school with a thriving theater club to help develop her acting skills. After graduating from high school, she enrolled at the vocational college Human Academy in 2009. Following her graduation from Human Academy in 2011, she enrolled at the Haikyō's voice acting school, finishing her studies that same year.

Acting career
After becoming a part of the Tokyo Actor's Consumer's Cooperative Society following her graduation from their acting school, Murakawa began playing roles in anime series. Her first anime role was as the character Coco in the 80th episode of the anime series Fairy Tail. She would continue to play supporting roles until 2013, when she was cast in her first main role as Aoi Futaba in the anime series Vividred Operation. That same year, she played a role in the anime film Hunter × Hunter: Phantom Rouge, which greatly pleased her as Hunter × Hunter was what originally inspired her to become a voice actress. Later that year, she was cast as Hotaru Ichijō in the anime series Non Non Biyori, and Escha Malier in the video game Atelier Escha & Logy: Alchemists of the Dusk Sky.

In 2014, Murakawa reprised the role of Escha for the anime series adaptation of Atelier Escha & Logy: Alchemists of the Dusk Sky. She also played the role of Megumi Natsu in Is the Order a Rabbit? and Ruri Aoi in Minarai Diva. In 2015, she was cast as the role Nyaa-tan in Etotama, and in 2016 she played the role of Ram in Re:Zero − Starting Life in Another World In 2017, she played the role of Constanze in Little Witch Academia, and in 2018 she played the role of Anzu in Hinamatsuri.

In 2019, she voiced Eyeone, a major villain in Star Twinkle PreCure, the 16th season of the Pretty Cure franchise. Murakawa has announced her interest in voicing a mainstream Pretty Cure.

On October 1, 2020, Murakawa transferred from Haikyō to Stay Luck.

Music career
Murakawa's music career began with the release of her first single "Sweet Sensation/Baby, My First Kiss" on June 1, 2016; the song "Sweet Sensation" was used as opening theme to the anime series Age 12: A Little Heart-Pounding. Her second single  was released on November 2, 2016; the title track is used as the ending theme to the anime series Kiss Him, Not Me. She released her first album RiEMUSiC on January 11, 2017. This was followed by two singles that year: "Tiny Tiny"/ on May 17, and "Night terror" on October 11; "Tiny Tiny" was used as the opening theme to the anime series Frame Arms Girl, She released her second album RiESiNFONiA on February 28, 2018, and she released the single "Distance" on May 23, 2018; the song "Distance" was used as the opening theme to Hinamatsuri. She released the single  on February 20, 2019; the title song is used as the ending theme to the anime series Forest of Piano. In the second season of Re:Zero − Starting Life in Another World anime, the song "Anata no Shiranai Koto" (あなたの知らないこと) was used as the insert song in episode 23.

Personal life
Murakawa has an older sister and a younger brother.
Voice actors who are close to her include Ayane Sakura, Aya Uchida, Mikako Komatsu, Maaya Uchida, Nozomi Yamamoto, Hiromi Igarashi, Minami Tsuda, and Yoshino Nanjō.
When she and Aya Uchida appear together on TV programs, Uchida treats the high-spirited Murakawa like she's an idiot by saying, "Riesson, shut up! This has become a common practice. In response, Uchida said, "Aya-san always says, 'Shut up! But I think she really loves me, and I love her too. In the December 2013 issue of Seiyuu Grand Prix, she and Uchida participated in "Majitomo," a project in which two voice actors who are good friends of each other discuss the trajectory of their relationship since they met. in which she and Uchida were featured together.

Filmography

TV animation
2011
Fairy Tail, Coco
2012
Code:Breaker,  Girl (ep 13)
Fairy Tail, Beth Vanderwood
Say "I love you", Girl (ep 5)
Shining Hearts: Shiawase no Pan, Child 1
2013
AKB0048 next stage, Research student A
A Certain Scientific Railgun S, Voice, Female Student B (ep 13), Client (ep 22)
Hyperdimension Neptunia: The Animation, Child

Kin-iro Mosaic, Mitsuki Inokuma, Female High School Student B (ep 2)
Non Non Biyori, Hotaru Ichijō
Oreshura, Female student A (ep 2)

Futari wa Milky Holmes, Alice's small bird, Girl C
The Severing Crime Edge, Female student (ep 2)
Unbreakable Machine-Doll, Female Student (ep 2)
Vividred Operation, Aoi Futaba
Yuyushiki, Female student 1 (ep 1), Kōhai B (ep 9)
Yozakura Quartet ~Hana no Uta~, 2nd District Girl B (ep 1), Girl 1, Girl
2014
Atelier Escha & Logy: Alchemists of the Dusk Sky,  Escha Malier
Bladedance of Elementalers, Student (eps 1, 5)
Dragon Collection, Miss Dragonia, Green Puppy
Fairy Tail (2014), Beth Vanderwood
Is the Order a Rabbit?, Megumi Natsu
Log Horizon 2, Lizé, Pianississimo
Magica Wars, Rin Kobari
Maken-Ki! Two, Black Rabbit
Minarai Diva, Ruri Aoi
Nanana's Buried Treasure, Kamone Misaki
Nano Invaders as Take
Parasyte -the maxim-, Misaki 
SoniAni: Super Sonico The Animation, Hibiki Komatsuri
Trinity Seven, Yui Kurata
Wake Up, Girls!, Maid
When Supernatural Battles Became Commonplace, Umeko Tanaka
Your Lie in April, Participant, Female student
Z/X Ignition, Quon (Cait Sith)
2015
Etotama, Nyaa-tan
Is It Wrong to Try to Pick Up Girls in a Dungeon?, Tiona Hiryute
Is the Order a Rabbit??, Megumi Natsu
Hello!! Kin-iro Mosaic, Mitsuki Inokuma
Non Non Biyori Repeat, Hotaru Ichijō

Rin-ne, Ageha
Show by Rock!!, Jacqueline
Wakaba Girl, Nao Hashiba
Yurikuma Arashi, Chōko Oki
2016
Brave Witches, Naoe Kanno
Magic of Stella, Shiina Murakami
Pandora in the Crimson Shell: Ghost Urn, Bunny
Phantasy Star Online 2 The Animation, Mika Konoe
Re:Zero − Starting Life in Another World, Ram
Show by Rock!! Short!!, Jacqueline
Show by Rock!! #, Jacqueline
Tanaka-kun is Always Listless, Saionji
2017
Action Heroine Cheer Fruits, Roko Kuroki
Chain Chronicle ~Light of Haecceitas~, Kiki
Is It Wrong to Try to Pick Up Girls in a Dungeon?: Sword Oratoria, Tiona Hiryute
Little Witch Academia, Constanze Amalie von Braunschbank-Albrechtsberger, Wangari
One Room, Natsuki Momohara
Schoolgirl Strikers: Animation Channel, Haruka Kurimoto
PriPri Chi-chan!!, Chi-chan
Re:Creators, Mamika Kirameki
Tsuki ga Kirei, Chinatsu Nishio
2018
Caligula, Kotono Kashiwaba
Hinamatsuri, Anzu
Shinkansen Henkei Robo Shinkalion, Tsuranuki Daimonyama
2019
Horrid Henry, Rude Ralph
Isekai Quartet, Ram
My Hero Academia 4, Bubble Girl
One Room Second Season, Natsuki Momohara
Pastel Memories, Yuina Machiya
Star Twinkle PreCure, Eyeone
2020
Re:Zero − Starting Life in Another World 2nd Season, Ram
The God of High School, Saturn 
One Room Third Season, Natsuki Momohara
2021
LBX Girls, Yui
Show by Rock!! Stars!!, Jacqueline
Non Non Biyori Nonstop, Hotaru Ichijō
Log Horizon: Destruction of the Round Table, Lizé
Komi Can't Communicate, Najimi Osana
2022
I'm the Villainess, So I'm Taming the Final Boss, Rachel Danis

Original net animation (ONA)
KY kei JC Kuuki-chan (2013), Kuuki Yominashi
Monster Strike (2015), Karin Homura

Original video animation (OVA)
Non Non Biyori OVA (2014), Hotaru Ichijō
Trinity Seven OVA (2015), Yui Kurata
Nekota no Koto ga Ki ni Natte Shikatanai OVA (2015), Haruna Inui
Robot Atom (2015), Atom
Non Non Biyori Repeat OVA (2016), Hotaru Ichijō

Theatrical animation
Hunter × Hunter: Phantom Rouge (2013)
Little Witch Academia: The Enchanted Parade (2015), Constanze Amalie von Braunschbank-Albrechtsberger
Kiniro Mosaic: Pretty Days (2016), Mitsuki Inokuma
Trinity Seven the Movie: The Eternal Library and the Alchemist Girl (2017), Yui Kurata
Non Non Biyori Vacation (2018), Hotaru Ichijo
Trinity Seven: Heavens Library & Crimson Lord (2019), Yui Kurata

Video games
Lord of Vermilion Re:2 (2011), Ishtar
Pop'n Music Portable 2 (2011), Mimi
Atelier Escha & Logy: Alchemists of the Dusk Sky (2013), Escha Malier
Final Fantasy XIV: A Realm Reborn (2013), Alisaie
Girl Friend Beta (2013), Tsudzuri Shirase
Lord of Vermilion III (2013), Wu Zetian
The Idolm@ster Million Live! (2013), Arisa Matsuda
Valkyria Chronicles Duel (2013), Loretta Rembrandt
Vividred Operation: Hyper Intimate Power (2013), Aoi Futaba
Yome Collection (2013), Aoi Futaba
Atelier Shallie: Alchemists of the Dusk Sea (2014), Escha Malier
Fire Emblem If (2015), Kagerou
Moe Chronicle (2014), Lilia
Grimoire: Grimoire Private Magic School (2014)
Magica Wars Zanbatsu (2014), Rin Kobari
Oreshika: Tainted Bloodlines (2014)
Schoolgirl Strikers (2014), Haruka Kurimoto
SoniPro (2014), Hibiki Komatsuri
Island (2016) - Sara Garando
The Caligula Effect (2016), Kotono Kashiwaba
Band Yarouze! (2016), Mint
Fire Emblem Echoes: Shadows of Valentia (2017), Est
Fire Emblem Heroes (2017), Kagerou, Est
Little Witch Academia: Chamber of Time (2017), Constanze Amalie von Braunschbank-Albrechtsberger, Wangari
Re:Zero -Starting Life in Another World- Death or Kiss (2017), Ram
 Another Eden (2019), Melina
 Arknights (2019), Absinthe
 Magia Record (2019), Matsuri Hinata
 Tokyo Afterschool Summoners (2020), Ellie
 Girls' Frontline (2021), Browning HP-35 & Colt Defender

Discography

Singles

Albums

References

External links
  
 

1990 births
Living people
Anime singers
Japanese video game actresses
Japanese voice actresses
Musicians from Saitama Prefecture
Nippon Columbia artists
Tokyo Actor's Consumer's Cooperative Society voice actors
Voice actresses from Saitama Prefecture
21st-century Japanese actresses
21st-century Japanese women singers
21st-century Japanese singers